Bılıx (also, Bilykh, Blykh, and Bylykh) is a village and municipality in the Qabala Rayon of Azerbaijan.  It has a population of 862.

References 

Populated places in Qabala District